Mille bolle blu ("A thousand blue bubbles") is a 1993 Italian comedy film written and directed by Leone Pompucci.

It was screened in the Italian Panorama section at the 50th Venice International Film Festival. For this film Leone Pompucci won the David di Donatello for Best New Director.

Cast 

Claudio Bigagli: Guido
Antonio Catania: Fugitive
Clelia Rondinella: Fugitive's Wife
Stefano Dionisi: Antonio
Evelina Gori: Guido's Mother
Paolo Bonacelli: Mario
Orazio Stracuzzi: Gino
Ludovica Modugno:  Gino's Wife 
Gina Rovere: Maid
Matteo Fadda: Sandrino
Stefano Masciarelli: Sandrino's Father
Carla Benedetti: Sandrino's Mother
Stefania Montorsi: Bride
Maurizio Mattioli: Cantoni 
Gigi Proietti: Narrator (voice)

See also      
 List of Italian films of 1993

References

External links

1993 films
Italian comedy films
1993 comedy films
Films set in Rome
Films shot in Rome
1993 directorial debut films
1990s Italian films